Kamaluddin Nezami (also, Nizami) is an Afghan politician who was appointed governor of Panjshir Province in 2016. , his status as governor is unclear.

Culture and education
Kamaluddin Nezami is an engineer of Tajik ethnic background. From Bazarak of Panjshir Province.

Governorship
Kamaluddin Nezami became governor of Panjshir Province in 2016. In February 2020, during the power struggle between Ashraf Ghani and Abdullah Abdullah, Nezami declared his loyalty to Abdullah Abdullah, Chief Executive of the National Unity Government established in 2014. Nezami stated that he would disobey orders from Ghani.

Actions taken in 2021 during Nezami's governorship included consultation with citizens' and local government representatives on "social obstacles" to the Central Asia-South Asia power project that aims to bring surplus electrical power to Afghanistan and Pakistan from neighbouring countries.

Panjshir conflict
During the 2021 Panjshir conflict that followed the 15 August 2021 Fall of Kabul, Nezami stated in early September that drones were used to bombard National Resistance Front of Afghanistan forces in Panjshir.

References

Living people
Governors of Panjshir Province
Afghan engineers
Year of birth missing (living people)